Fritz Brupbacher (30 June 1874 – 1 January 1945) was a Swiss medical doctor, libertarian socialist and writer.

Biography

Youth and study time
His father managed to achieve social advancement from a poor orphan to hotel owner of Zurich's Bahnhofstrasse. His mother, on the other hand, came from bourgeois circles in which the intellectual liberalism of the 1830s ("Vormärz") was still alive. In high school, Fritz Brupbacher's liberal worldview was shaped, which he retained through his life. After a lecture by Auguste Forel, he and Max Huber founded the temperant grammar school association Progress.

From 1893 he studied medicine in Geneva and Zurich. In 1896 he became president of the Zurich section of the Swiss academic temperance association. This association served him as a platform for literary and socio-ethical debates. With the essay Our colleague, Brupbacher advocated the right to vote for women studying at the University of Zurich. In 1897 he met his future wife, the Russian student Lidiya Petrovna Kochetkova (1872–1921) from Samara on the Volga, who was committed to socialism. After the state examination in 1898, Brupbacher turned to psychiatry, encouraged by Auguste Forel, the head of the Burghölzli psychiatric clinic. In 1899 he therefore went to the renowned Hôpital Salpêtrière in Paris for further training. During his stay in Paris he met the German writers Oskar Panizza and Frank Wedekind.

Workers' doctor and social democrat
In 1901 Brupbacher opened his medical practice at Kasernenstrasse 17 in the Zurich workers' quarter Aussersihl. In the same year he married Lydia Petrovna, who after graduating mainly worked as a doctor in Russian villages. In his opinion, the misery that Brupbacher got to know as a workers' doctor was the result of alcoholism and having a large number of children. With his brochure Children's Blessings – And No End? he campaigned for birth control to improve the lot of working class women. This font had a huge echo in the labor movement in the German-speaking countries and had a circulation of 500,000 copies in 20 years.

In addition to his medical work, he devoted himself to the propaganda of a libertarian socialism in the working class. He founded reading circles like Schwänli, gave lectures and published the agitation magazine Junge Schweiz from 1899 to 1900. From 1900 to 1904 Brupbacher was a member of the Social Democratic Party of Switzerland in the Zurich City Council. In 1905, he and his wife visited the Russian anarchist Peter Kropotkin on the island of Jersey, from whose book Mutual Aid he was very impressed. There he met James Guillaume and became enthusiastic about French revolutionary syndicalism. In the same year he founded the Zurich Antimilitarist League. In 1907 he took up Vera Figner when she came to the West after 22 years in the Tsar's prison. In 1911 he traveled to Russia twice to visit his wife, who suffered from famine and was arrested by the Okhrana and exiled in Mesen. Their partnership failed in 1916 because of differing views on the decisive force for the revolutionary process in Europe. While Petrovna saw it in the Russian peasantry, Brupbacher held fast to internationalism.

Political activities
With his friend Max Tobler, Brupbacher was editor of the monthly Polis from 1906 to 1908. He has also contributed to Popular Law, the Outpost, Free Youth, The Revolutionary, The Fighter, La Vie Ouvrière and other French syndicalist newspapers. From 1908 to 1911 he trained workers in lecturer courses. After the Zurich general strike of 1912, Robert Grimm declared to the party: "But now out with Brupbacher". The attempt to expel him from the Social Democratic Party in 1914 because of his anarchist sympathies was suspended because of the strong resistance of his friends. In 1921 he left the party himself to join the newly founded Swiss Communist Party. In the same year he and Willi Munzenberg accompanied a food transport of the International Workers Aid (IAH) to the hungry areas of the RSFSR. In 1933 Brupbacher, who criticized Stalin for his fight against Trotsky, was expelled from the Communist Party for "completely anti-Marxist anarchist attitudes".

Sex education with Paulette Brupbacher
In 1922 Fritz Brupbacher met the Russian doctor Paulette Gutzeit-Raygrodski, who became his second wife. Together they ran the practice in Zurich-Aussersihl for twenty years. Like her husband, Paulette Brupbacher did pioneering work in the field of sex education. She appeared at events organized by Fritz Brupbacher, who was responsible for the Communist Party's educational work. She took a stand in favor of abortion for medical, economic and social reasons, demanded child benefits, crèches, maternity leave and the funding of contraceptives by the health insurance company. After a lecture in 1936, the government council of the canton of Solothurn imposed a ban on public speaking, which was finally upheld by the federal court after an objection. The doctor summarized her experiences in 1953 in the book My Patients.

Freedom fighter and humanist
Brupbacher's struggle for legal abortion was a continuation of his earlier efforts at birth control. During World War II, he wrote the book Soul Hygiene for Healthy Heiden (1943) as a challenge to the totalitarian forces. With this he wanted to promote the keeping of the democratic idea and help to continue the traditions of intellectual freedom and independence of Switzerland. His last book, The Meaning of Life, was his testament "after the bankruptcy of socialism", the balance sheet of his own work "for the common man who wants to think for himself, who wants to inherit from us, to whom he builds wants to learn from what we have learned."

Honors
There is a memorial for Fritz and Paulette Brupbacher at the Hönggerberg cemetery. In today's Zurich city district 3, to which the former workers' quarter Aussersihl belongs, a square was named "Brupbacherplatz" in 2009, with one half of the square being dedicated to Fritz Brupbacher and the other to Paulette Brupbacher-Raygrodski.

References

1874 births
1945 deaths
20th-century Swiss physicians
20th-century Swiss writers
Anarchist writers
Libertarian socialists
Swiss anarchists
Swiss male writers
Swiss non-fiction writers